Richard D. Taylor (born April 5, 1931) is a former Iowa State Representative from the 53rd and 33rd Districts. He served in the Iowa House of Representatives from 2000 to 2009. He resigned in October 2009 because of family health concerns.

Prior to serving in the Iowa House, Taylor served in the United States Navy and was an electrician. Taylor served on the Robins, Iowa City Council.

During his last term in office, Taylor served on several committees in the Iowa House - the Commerce, Local Government, and Veterans Affairs committees.  He also served on the Natural Resources Committee, where he was vice chair, and on the Justice System Appropriations Subcommittee.  Earlier in his term, until November 2007, he served as vice chair of the Veterans Affairs Committee.

Taylor was first elected to House District 53 in a January 4, 2000 special election following fellow Democrat Kay Chapman's resignation.  The unusual, early date of the election meant that voter registration deadline was on Christmas and the county auditor's office had to be open on New Year's Day (both public holidays).  After the district lines were redrawn for the 2002 election, he represented the new District 53.  He resigned from office on October 14, 2009 and was succeeded by fellow Democrat Kirsten Running-Marquardt.

Electoral history
*incumbent

References

External links

 Taylor on Project Vote Smart
 Taylor's Capitol Web Address

Iowa city council members
Democratic Party members of the Iowa House of Representatives
People from Algona, Iowa
Politicians from Cedar Rapids, Iowa
1931 births
Living people